Interlink Publishing is an independent publishing house, founded in 1987 and based in Northampton, Massachusetts, USA. , it published an average of 90 books a year and had 800 titles in print.

Overview
The company specializes in publishing in the following subject areas:
 World travel
 World literature (Interlink World Fiction series)
 World history and politics
 Art
 World music and dance
 International cooking (including vegetarian)
 Children's books from around the world.
Many of its books concern Celtic culture. It also publishes series entitled On-the-Road Histories, International Folk Tales, Illustrated History, and Emerging Voices New International Fiction.

The company publishes under five imprints:
 Interlink Books
 Cadogan Guides, USA
 Olive Branch Press: "socially and politically relevant non-fiction", with an emphasis on non-Western material
 Clockroot Books
 Crocodile Books, USA: illustrated books from around the world for children aged 3–8

References

External links 
 www.interlinkbooks.com corporate website

Book publishing companies based in Massachusetts
Publishing companies established in 1987
Northampton, Massachusetts